Abdisalam Yassin Mohamed is a Somali professor and academic who had taken part in the establishment of the Somali National Movement (SNM). He holds a PhD in African Literature from SOAS University of London. He taught at King Saud University and King Abdulaziz University of Saudi Arabia. He is currently the president of Shifa University in Somaliland. His research was published in multiple academic journals, including the Journal of Muslim Minority Affairs (Taylor & Francis).

References 

Living people
Year of birth missing (living people)
Place of birth missing (living people)
Somalian scholars
Alumni of SOAS University of London
Academic staff of King Saud University
Academic staff of King Abdulaziz University
Somaliland people
Somalian academic administrators
Literary scholars